Jean May Campbell (20 May 1901 – 10 December 1984) was an Australian novelist and literary personality.

Early life
Campbell was born in Melbourne on 20 May 1901, the daughter of Louise (née Bollinger) and John McNeil Campbell. Her father, born in Scotland, worked as a bank manager. She attended Presbyterian Ladies' College, Melbourne, where she led the debating team and was editor of the school magazine. Campbell briefly attended the University of Melbourne on a non-degree course. She became a licentiate of the Trinity College of Music and worked as an elocution instructor.

Career
Campbell's unpublished first novel Plato the Impossible was written while she was a student, for a contest run by C. J. De Garis. In 1933, her work Brass & Cymbals was published by Hutchinson, studying "the strains experienced by a Jewish immigrant family in Melbourne". Hutchinson published four further novels – Lest We Lose Our Edens (1935), Greek Key Pattern (1935), The Red Sweet Wine (1937), and The Babe Wise (1939) – which shared in common an urban setting and ethnically diverse characters. Campbell was a prominent literary personality, making frequent appearances in newspapers and magazines. She had her portrait painted by her friend Lina Bryans.

During World War II, Campbell was employed as a censorship officer in the Department of Defence and Department of Information. She wrote fourteen anonymous pulp fiction romances between 1943 and 1945, which were published by the New Century Press in Sydney. She was awarded a Commonwealth Literary Fund fellowship in 1947 to a write a novel about "a neglected Melbourne adolescent boy", however the work – titled Runt – was never published.

Campbell was state president of the Fellowship of Australian Writers from 1954 to 1955 and was also secretary of the Melbourne Little Theatre. In 1955 she helped organise a book week for the inaugural Moomba Festival, together with Andrew Fabinyi and Lina Bryans. In her later years, Campbell appeared in a number of art films, including three by Paul Cox. She narrated his short documentary We Are All Alone My Dear (1975) about life in her retirement village.

Personal life
In 1921, Campbell became the mistress of John Rose Gorton, a businessman whose son John Grey Gorton became prime minister of Australia. She lived intermittently with him at his Mystic Park estate until his death in 1936. She died in St Kilda East, Victoria, on 10 December 1984, aged 83.

References

1901 births
1984 deaths
Writers from Melbourne
Australian people of Scottish descent
People educated at the Presbyterian Ladies' College, Melbourne
Australian women novelists